Fazal Din VC (1 July 1921 – 2 March 1945) was an Indian recipient of the Victoria Cross, the highest award for gallantry in the face of the enemy that can be awarded to British and Commonwealth forces.

Early life
He was born in 1921 to a Punjabi Muslim family in the Hoshiarpur District of Punjab, British India. Fazal Din, having only passed Middle School, was inspired to join the British Indian Army by the outbreak of the World War. He was recruited as a rifleman and became a section gunner in the 10th Baluch Regiment, before rising to the rank of Naik - equivalent to a British Army corporal.

Victoria Cross citation
Fazal Din was 23 years old, and an acting naik in the 7th Battalion of 10th Baluch Regiment, British Indian Army during the battle of Mektila.

The official citation to the award describes his actions:

Notes

References

External links
Fazal Din

1921 births
1945 deaths
Indian World War II recipients of the Victoria Cross
British Indian Army soldiers
Indian Army personnel killed in World War II
Punjabi people
People from Hoshiarpur district